Allison Glacier is a small glacier in Victoria Land, Antarctica. Its head is located just north of Mount Huggins, descending from the west slopes of Royal Society Range into Skelton Glacier. Abbott Spur separates the lower ends of Rutgers Glacier from Allison Glacier.

Discovery and naming
It was named by the Advisory Committee on Antarctic Names in 1963 for Lieutenant Commander John K. Allison, United States Navy, officer in charge of the wintering-over detachment of U.S. Navy Air Development Squadron Six (VX-6) at McMurdo Station, 1959.

See also
 List of glaciers in the Antarctic
 Glaciology

References

Glaciers of Scott Coast